York Square Cinema (1970-2005) is a former art house cinema located in Downtown New Haven, Connecticut, USA. The York Square was built in 1970.  It housed three separate movie theaters in a renovation that connected several old buildings.  The only live remaining owner, Robert Spodick, decided to close the doors of the York Square in July 2005 after several unsuccessful lawsuits with the large distribution chains.

The lawsuits concerned allegedly "unfair" and "unspoken" distribution agreements between the large movie distribution chains and the suburban cineplexes in the neighboring towns of Orange, North Haven, and Milford.  Although many people suspect that the opening of Bowtie Partners Criterion Theater a few blocks away was cause for the York Square's closing, those who ran the York Square adamantly denied that the competitive theater had anything to do with the decision to close.    

In their farewell letter, the York Square Management stated:

After 60 years of film exhibition in New Haven, I have decided to close the York Square. It’s been a good, long run, and we can happily reflect on our years of bringing to New Haven thousands of choices in the best in foreign and domestic film. We are no longer able to withstand the crushing pressure of the Showcase monopoly. We are simply not allowed to choose new films to play, and to upgrade and maintain our traditional relationship with our patrons. We have reached the point where we must say "Enough is enough."

External links 
 York Square Cinema--ready for the big leagues?

Buildings and structures completed in 1970
2005 disestablishments in Connecticut
Economy of New Haven, Connecticut
Cinemas and movie theaters in Connecticut
Buildings and structures in New Haven, Connecticut